The 2022 French motorcycle Grand Prix (officially known as the Shark Grand Prix de France) was the seventh round of the 2022 Grand Prix motorcycle racing season and the second round of the 2022 MotoE World Cup. All races (except MotoE race 1 which was held on 14 May) were held at the Bugatti Circuit in Le Mans on 15 May 2022.

Background

Riders' entries 
In MotoGP class the riders and teams were the same as the season entry list with no additional stand-in riders for the race. In the Moto2 class, after the termination of the contract between Speed Up and Romano Fenati, the team chose to replace him with Alonso López; Stefano Manzi continues to replace Keminth Kubo in the Yamaha VR46 Master Camp Team, given the Thai rider's inadequacy. In the Moto3 class, in addition to the presence of Gerard Riu to replace David Muñoz on the KTM of the Boé SKX, the Italian rider Alberto Surra is still unavailable due to a fracture to his scaphoid in the GP of the Americas. After being replaced in the stages of Portugal and Spain by the Malaysian Syarifuddin Azman, in this Grand Prix the choice of the Rivacold Snipers Team goes to the Spaniard José Antonio Rueda; while John McPhee returns to the track with the Sterilgarda Husqvarna Max team after he is healed in the vertebra. In the MotoE class, Xavi Cardelus makes his debut this season in Avintia Esponsorama Racing after missing the opening stage in Jerez due to injury, while Bradley Smith is still out due to injury after his crash at the 24 Hours of Le Mans. WithU GRT RNF MotoE Team replaces him with Andrea Mantovani.

MotoGP Championship standings before the race 
In the riders' classification, Fabio Quartararo became the only leader with 89 points. Aleix Espargaró with 82 points climbs into second position, ahead of Enea Bastianini and Álex Rins (before the Spanish Grand Prix in the lead with Quartararo) with 69 points and Francesco Bagnaia, winner in Jerez, and Joan Mir with 56 points. In the constructors' classification, Ducati is confirmed in the lead with 131 points, 42 points ahead of Yamaha, 48 over Aprilia, 51 over Suzuki, 55 over KTM and 74 over Honda. In the team standings, Team Suzuki Ecstar is first with 125 points, followed by Aprilia Racing (109 points), Monster Energy Yamaha MotoGP (107 points), Ducati Lenovo Team (98 points) and Red Bull KTM Factory Racing (91 points).

Moto2 Championship standings before the race 
In the riders' classification, Celestino Vietti is always in the lead with 100 points, 19 more than Ai Ogura (victorious in the previous race), 30 more than Tony Arbolino, 31 more than Arón Canet, who overtakes Joe Roberts (to minus 43 points from the leader). The constructors' classification sees Kalex at 150 points, Boscoscuro at 20 points and MV Agusta at 5 points. The top five positions in the team standings are occupied by Idemitsu Honda Team Asia (126 points), Flexbox HP40 (114 points), Elf Marc VDS Racing Team (105 points), Mooney VR46 Racing Team (100 points) and Liqui Moly Intact GP (75 points).

Moto3 Championship standings before the race 
Sergio García increases the advantage over Dennis Foggia at the top of the riders' standings (103 points for the first, 82 points for the second). Izan Guevara, winner in Jerez, is third with 73 points, 3 more than Jaume Masià and 10 more than Deniz Öncü. In the constructors' classification, Gas Gas leads with 124 points, 21 more than Honda, 26 more than KTM, 58 more than Husqvarna and 63 more than CFMoto. In the team championship standings, Aspar Team is firmly in the lead with 176 points, followed by 67 points behind by Leopard Racing. Red Bull KTM Ajo is third with 93 points, 14 more than CFMoto Racing Prüstel GP and 23 more than Red Bull KTM Tech3.

MotoE cup standings before the race 
Eric Granado, winner of both races in Jerez, leads with full points with 50 points, with a 17-point lead over Dominique Aegerter. Miquel Pons is third at 28 points, followed by Matteo Ferrari (26 points) and Hikari Okubo (21 points).

Free practice

MotoGP 
In the first session, Pol Espargaró was the fastest, followed by Álex Rins and Francesco Bagnaia. In the second session, Enea Bastianini preceded Aleix Espargaró and Rins. In the third session, Johann Zarco finished at the top of the standings ahead of Bagnaia and Fabio Quartararo.

Combined Free Practice 1-2-3 
The top ten riders (written in bold) qualified in Q2.

Free practice 4 
Fabio Quartararo finished in the lead ahead of Álex Rins and Francesco Bagnaia.

Moto2 
Somkiat Chantra finished ahead of everyone in the first session ahead of Augusto Fernández and Stefano Manzi. In the second and third session the fastest was Pedro Acosta: in the first case he preceded Chantra and Fernández, in the second case Fernández ahead of Chantra.

Combined Free Practice 1-2-3 
The top fourteen riders (written in bold) qualified in Q2.

Moto3 
Dennis Foggia was the dominator of free practice, having been the fastest in all three sessions. In the first he preceded his teammate Tatsuki Suzuki and Andrea Migno, in the second and third he finished ahead of Izan Guevara and Suzuki.

Combined Free Practice 1-2-3 
The top fourteen riders (written in bold) qualified in Q2.

MotoE 
In the first session, Mattia Casadei was the fastest, ahead of Jordi Torres and Miquel Pons. In the second, Torres finished in the lead ahead of Matteo Ferrari and Kevin Zannoni.

Combined Free Practice 1 and 2 
The top eight riders (written in bold) qualified in Q2.

Qualifying

MotoGP

Moto2

Moto3

MotoE

Warm up

MotoGP 
Aleix Espargaró was the fastest, followed by Fabio Quartararo and Takaaki Nakagami.

Moto2 
Pedro Acosta preceded Jake Dixon and Augusto Fernández.

Moto3 
The first three positions were conquered by Jaume Masià, Daniel Holgado and Diogo Moreira.

Race

MotoGP

Moto2

 Sam Lowes was declared unfit to compete following a crash in qualifying.

Moto3
The race, scheduled to be run for 22 laps, was red-flagged after 2 full laps due to a multi-rider incident involving a total of nine riders amid bad weather conditions. The race was later restarted over 14 laps with the original starting grid determined. Thus, all crashed riders were eligible to join the restart.

 Joel Kelso withdrew from the event due to effects of leg injury suffered during Spanish Grand Prix warm-up.

MotoE

Race 1 

All bikes manufactured by Energica.

Race 2 

All bikes manufactured by Energica.

Championship standings after the race
Below are the standings for the top five riders, constructors, and teams after the round.

MotoGP

Riders' Championship standings

Constructors' Championship standings

Teams' Championship standings

Moto2

Riders' Championship standings

Constructors' Championship standings

Teams' Championship standings

Moto3

Riders' Championship standings

Constructors' Championship standings

Teams' Championship standings

MotoE

References

External links 

2022 MotoGP race reports
motorcycle Grand Prix
2022
motorcycle Grand Prix